Amathusia friderici,  Bicolor-haired Palmking, is a butterfly found in the  Indomalayan realm It belongs to the Satyrinae, a subfamily of the brush-footed butterflies.

Description

Described as a variety of Amathusia phidippus from which it differs in the following minor respects. The upper hindwing has a concealed hair pencil (scent pencil-a dorsal glandular fold or oval shaped depression on the wing membrane covered by pencils of long hairs) in space 1b. The fringe in 1a is black-brown and just crosses vein 1a .The  upper hairs of the abdominal hair pencil are dark grey-brown; the lower hairs are light  yellowish buff. The female has a darker  ground colour than Amathusia phidippus  with rich clear pale orange subapical marks.

Subspecies
 A. f. friderici  Burma - Tenasserim
 A. f. holmanhunti  Corbet & Pendlebury, 1936  Peninsular Malaya
 A. utana   Corbet & Pendlebury, 1936  Peninsular Malaya, Sumatra, Java

References

External links
Amathusia friderici images at Consortium for the Barcode of Life (10)

Amathusia (butterfly)
Butterflies described in 1904